Linton Military Camp is the largest New Zealand Army base and is home to the Headquarters 1(NZ) Brigade. It is located just south of Palmerston North.

History 
The land that the present Linton Military Camp stands on was purchased by the Government in 1941 for use as a camp for Territorial and other home defence forces, with the first units taking up occupation in tented accommodation in February 1942, with the first prefabricated huts erected in August 1942. Unlike Burnham and Papakura, Linton was not initially intended to be mobilisation camp and as such was provided with minimal facilities. As the war intensified and the threat from Japan increased and the use of infrastructure in Palmerston North for defence purposes stretched to the limit, the decision was made to bring Linton up to the same standard as Burnham and Papakura.  Deliberately designed as a precaution against air attack Linton camp was designed with nine Battalion Blocks, with only eight being completed each with a;

 parade ground, 
 accommodation 
 cookhouse,
 mess building, and 
 ablutions.

Wartime construction was completed in 1945, and included;

 182 Permanent buildings,
521 two-men huts,
155 four-men huts,
480 eight-men huts,
 a power plant,
 water and sewage reticulation,
 rifle ranges,
 assault courses
 magazines.
 Railway siding.

Alternative Names 
Linton Camp was accepted in general usage from 1943, with the names Camp Manawatu or Camp Kairanga used earlier. Camp Ravenswood or Camp Whitmore were considered as new names in the 1960s, but uses of theses names never eventuated.

Demographics

There were 372 households. There were 1,164 males and 504 females, giving a sex ratio of 2.31 males per female. The median age was 23.9 years (compared with 37.4 years nationally), with 306 people (18.3%) aged under 15 years, 984 (59.0%) aged 15 to 29, 363 (21.8%) aged 30 to 64, and 15 (0.9%) aged 65 or older.

Ethnicities were 70.3% European/Pākehā, 40.5% Māori, 10.4% Pacific peoples, 3.1% Asian, and 7.4% other ethnicities (totals add to more than 100% since people could identify with multiple ethnicities).

The proportion of people born overseas was 10.1%, compared with 27.1% nationally.

Although some people objected to giving their religion, 62.6% had no religion, 28.1% were Christian, 0.4% were Muslim, 0.2% were Buddhist and 5.4% had other religions.

Of those at least 15 years old, 135 (9.9%) people had a bachelor or higher degree, and 63 (4.6%) people had no formal qualifications. The median income was $46,900, compared with $31,800 nationally. The employment status of those at least 15 was that 1,017 (74.7%) people were employed full-time, 102 (7.5%) were part-time, and 39 (2.9%) were unemployed.

Current units based at Linton

1st (New Zealand) Brigade
HQ 1 (NZ) Brigade commands the NZ Army's field forces day to day (less special forces) and prepares them for operations.

 Headquarters, 1st (NZ) Brigade

Combat Units 

 1st Battalion, Royal New Zealand Infantry Regiment
 Alpha Company
 Victor Company
 Whiskey Company
 Support Company
 Combat Service Support Company
Queen Alexandra's Mounted Rifles
 Wellington East Coast Squadron
 NZ Scots Squadron
 Waikato Mounted Rifles Squadron
 Support Squadron

Combat Support Units 

 16th Field Regiment, Royal Regiment of New Zealand Artillery 
 161 Battery
 163 Battery
2nd Engineer Regiment
HQ Squadron
2 Field Squadron (Combat Engineers)
25 Engineer Support Squadron
Emergency Response Squadron
1st Command Support Regiment
 Headquarter, 1st Command Support Regiment, Royal New Zealand Corps of Signals
 2nd Signal Squadron
 25 Cypher Section

Combat Service Support Units 

 2nd Combat Service Support Battalion, Royal New Zealand Army Logistic Regiment
 Headquarters, 2nd Combat Service Support Battalion
 10th Transport Company
 21st Supply Company
 2nd Workshop Company
 5th Movements Company
 38 Combat Service Support Company
 2nd Health Services Battalion (New Zealand) 
 Headquarters, 2nd Health Services Battalion (NZ)
 2nd Health Support Company
 General Support Health Company
 Logistics Support Company
 Linton Regional Support Centre (Linton Military Camp)

Headquarters Training and Doctrine Command 
Training and Doctrine Command (TRADOC) trains and educates Army's personnel; develops leaders; establishes training standards; manages doctrine; integrates lessons learned and training support across the Army.

 Mission Command Training School
 Collective Training Center
 Land Operations Training Center (Palmerston North)
 School of Military Engineering

Lockheed Martin New Zealand 
Lockheed Martin New Zealand provides logistics services for the NZDF including Maintenance, Repair, and Overhaul, Managed Fleet Utilisation and warehousing.

 Maintenance, Repair and Overhaul team
 Managed Fleet Utilisation team
Ration Pack Production Facility

Other Units
Joint Military Police Unit Linton 
Joint Logistic Support Agency service center
Human Resources service center

Incidents
A building belonging to the Ordnance Depot was gutted by fire on 18 February 1953

On Saturday 9 June 1956, fanned by an easterly breeze, a fire destroyed the Linton Military Camp cinema.

In October 2012, a series of shots were fired by an armed soldier, believed to be under the influence of alcohol, he then barricaded himself inside a house on the base. The NZ Police Armed Offenders Squad responded as well as the Military Police. After a five-hour siege, the police originally reported the man was apprehended, but later revealed he had committed suicide.

Barracks 
Linton Camps barracks are named after New Zealand Recipients of the Victoria Cross.

See also 
Burnham, New Zealand
Hopuhopu Camp
Papakura Military Camp
Trentham Military Camp
Waiouru Military Camp

References

Installations of the New Zealand Army
Military installations established in the 1940s
Palmerston North
Populated places on the Manawatū River